The 1993–94 NBA season was the Lakers' 46th season in the National Basketball Association, and 34th in the city of Los Angeles. During the off-season, the Lakers acquired Sam Bowie from the New Jersey Nets, and re-signed free agent and former Lakers forward Kurt Rambis. The Lakers continued to struggle as they lost 9 of their first 12 games, and held a 18–29 record at the All-Star break. Head coach Randy Pfund was fired after a 27–37 start, and was replaced with interim Bill Bertka for the next two games. With the team out of playoff position and struggling in March, they decided to bring former Laker and retired All-Star guard Magic Johnson back as their new coach. At midseason, the team acquired Danny Schayes from the Milwaukee Bucks. Under Magic, the Lakers won five of their next six games. However, they lost their final ten games of the season and finished fifth in the Pacific Division with a 33–49 record, missing the playoffs for the first time since 1975–76.

Vlade Divac led the team with 14.2 points, 10.8 rebounds and 1.4 blocks per game, while second-year guard Anthony Peeler averaged 14.1 points per game, but only played just 30 games due to a stress fracture in his left leg, and tendonitis in his right leg, and second round draft pick Nick Van Exel averaged 13.6 points and 5.8 assists per game, and was selected to the NBA All-Rookie Second Team. In addition, Sedale Threatt provided the team with 11.9 points, 4.2 assists and 1.4 steals per game, while Elden Campbell provided with 12.3 points, 6.8 rebounds and 1.9 blocks per game, second-year guard Doug Christie contributed 10.3 points and 1.4 steals per game, and James Worthy averaged 10.2 points per game off the bench. 

Following the season, Johnson resigned as head coach, while Worthy retired after twelve seasons with the Lakers, Christie was traded to the New York Knicks, and Schayes signed as a free agent with the Phoenix Suns.

Draft picks

Roster

Regular season

Season standings

z - clinched division title
y - clinched division title
x - clinched playoff spot

Record vs. opponents

Game log

Regular season

|- style="background:#cfc;"
| 1
| November 5
| Phoenix
| W 116-108
| Nick Van Exel (23)
| Vlade Divac (8)
| Tony Smith (9)
| Great Western Forum17,505
| 1-0
|- style="background:#fcc;"
| 2
| November 6
| @ Seattle
| L 101-129
| Nick Van Exel (19)
| Vlade Divac (12)
| Nick Van Exel (5)
| Seattle Center Coliseum14,813
| 1-1
|- style="background:#fcc;"
| 3
| November 9
| Portland
| L 102-109
| James Worthy (21)
| Vlade Divac (12)
| Nick Van Exel (10)
| Great Western Forum11,476
| 1-2
|- style="background:#fcc;"
| 4
| November 10
| @ Sacramento
| L 101-112
| James Worthy (20)
| Vlade Divac (15)
| Nick Van Exel (9)
| ARCO Arena17,317
| 1-3
|- style="background:#fcc;"
| 5
| November 12
| Denver
| L 84-113
| Doug Christie (21)
| Tony Smith (8)
| Nick Van Exel (4)
| Great Western Forum11,215
| 1-4
|- style="background:#cfc;"
| 6
| November 14
| Cleveland
| W 107-100
| Bowie & Christie (18)
| Vlade Divac (13)
| Nick Van Exel (6)
| Great Western Forum11,139
| 2-4
|- style="background:#cfc;"
| 7
| November 16
| L.A. Clippers
| W 116-114 (2OT)
| 3 players tied (23)
| Vlade Divac (24)
| Nick Van Exel (9)
| Great Western Forum11,012
| 3-4
|- style="background:#fcc;"
| 8
| November 18
| @ Golden State
| L 76-103
| Elden Campbell (15)
| Christie & Divac (7)
| Nick Van Exel (4)
| Oakland-Alameda County Coliseum Arena15,025
| 3-5
|- style="background:#fcc;"
| 9
| November 19
| Chicago
| L 86-88
| Doug Christie (22)
| Campbell & Divac (7)
| Nick Van Exel (9)
| Great Western Forum15,512
| 3-6
|- style="background:#fcc;"
| 10
| November 21
| @ New Jersey
| L 102-105
| Sedale Threatt (30)
| Vlade Divac (14)
| Vlade Divac (4)
| Brendan Byrne Arena12,205
| 3-7
|- style="background:#fcc;"
| 11
| November 23
| @ Atlanta
| L 94-103
| Nick Van Exel (22)
| Campbell & Divac (11)
| Nick Van Exel (5)
| Omni Coliseum10,920
| 3-8
|- style="background:#fcc;"
| 12
| November 24
| @ Charlotte
| L 124-141
| Anthony Peeler (21)
| Vlade Divac (7)
| Sedale Threatt (10)
| Charlotte Coliseum23,698
| 3-9
|- style="background:#cfc;"
| 13
| November 26
| @ Indiana
| W 102-100
| Anthony Peeler (21)
| Divac & Peeler (8)
| James Worthy (8)
| Market Square Arena16,313
| 4-9
|- style="background:#cfc;"
| 14
| November 27
| @ Minnesota
| W 96-92
| Vlade Divac (20)
| Vlade Divac (12)
| Threatt & Van Exel (5)
| Target Center18,354
| 5-9

|- style="background:#cfc;"
| 15
| December 1
| Dallas
| W 124-91
| Elden Campbell (18)
| Vlade Divac (8)
| Nick Van Exel (11)
| Great Western Forum10,319
| 6-9
|- style="background:#cfc;"
| 16
| December 4
| @ L.A. Clippers
| W 109-102
| Doug Christie (33)
| Sam Bowie (9)
| 3 players tied (7)
| Los Angeles Memorial Sports Arena16,005
| 7-9
|- style="background:#fcc;"
| 17
| December 5
| Minnesota
| L 99-101
| Doug Christie (21)
| Campbell & Divac (7)
| Nick Van Exel (7)
| Great Western Forum11,256
| 7-10
|- style="background:#fcc;"
| 18
| December 7
| New York
| L 78-92
| Sam Bowie (20)
| Elden Campbell (12)
| Threatt & Van Exel (5)
| Great Western Forum14,147
| 7-11
|- style="background:#fcc;"
| 19
| December 10
| @ Portland
| L 99-117
| Elden Campbell (22)
| Elden Campbell (9)
| Sam Bowie (6)
| Memorial Coliseum12,888
| 7-12
|- style="background:#fcc;"
| 20
| December 12
| Golden State
| L 97-100
| Doug Christie (19)
| Sam Bowie (8)
| Sedale Threatt (8)
| Great Western Forum11,477
| 7-13
|- style="background:#cfc;"
| 21
| December 14
| @ Detroit
| W 99-93
| Sam Bowie (21)
| Elden Campbell (10)
| James Worthy (4)
| The Palace of Auburn Hills20,236
| 8-13
|- style="background:#fcc;"
| 22
| December 16
| @ New York
| L 85-108
| Christie & Worthy (14)
| Vlade Divac (13)
| Nick Van Exel (7)
| Madison Square Garden19,763
| 8-14
|- style="background:#fcc;"
| 23
| December 17
| @ Philadelphia
| L 94-105
| James Worthy (22)
| Campbell & Divac (9)
| Nick Van Exel (8)
| The Spectrum15,239
| 8-15
|- style="background:#fcc;"
| 24
| December 19
| @ Cleveland
| L 92-122
| Nick Van Exel (16)
| Elden Campbell (10)
| Nick Van Exel (8)
| Richfield Coliseum17,308
| 8-16
|- style="background:#cfc;"
| 25
| December 21
| @ Orlando
| W 109-102
| Doug Christie (31)
| Vlade Divac (11)
| Anthony Peeler (6)
| Orlando Arena15,291
| 9-16
|- style="background:#fcc;"
| 26
| December 23
| @ Miami
| L 92-109
| Nick Van Exel (16)
| Vlade Divac (11)
| Doug Christie  (5)
| Miami Arena15,200
| 9-17
|- style="background:#fcc;"
| 27
| December 26
| Houston
| L 93-118
| Doug Christie (20)
| Vlade Divac (11)
| Divac & Peeler (5)
| Great Western Forum15,393
| 9-18
|- style="background:#fcc;"
| 28
| December 29
| Seattle
| L 92-99
| Elden Campbell (20)
| Campbell & Divac (13)
| Sedale Threatt (10)
| Great Western Forum15,599
| 9-19

|- style="background:#fcc;"
| 29
| January 2
| @ San Antonio
| L 92-94
| Anthony Peeler (27)
| Elden Campbell (12)
| Sedale Threatt (7)
| Alamodome18,017
| 9-20
|- style="background:#cfc;"
| 30
| January 4
| @ Denver
| W 119-118
| James Worthy (27)
| Vlade Divac (13)
| Christie & Threatt (4)
| McNichols Sports Arena17,171
| 10-20
|- style="background:#fcc;"
| 31
| January 5
| @ Sacramento
| L 98-106
| Sedale Threatt (20)
| Vlade Divac (19)
| 3 players tied (3)
| ARCO Arena17,317
| 10-21
|- style="background:#cfc;"
| 32
| January 7
| L.A. Clippers
| W 111-108
| Anthony Peeler (26)
| Vlade Divac (16)
| Sedale Threatt (7)
| Great Western Forum14,321
| 11-21
|- style="background:#fcc;"
| 33
| January 9
| San Antonio
| L 89-95
| Nick Van Exel (19)
| Vlade Divac (8)
| Peeler & Threatt (5)
| Great Western Forum11,069
| 11-22
|- style="background:#fcc;"
| 34
| January 11
| Golden State
| L 117-122
| Nick Van Exel (28)
| Vlade Divac (9)
| Divac & Van Exel (7)
| Great Western Forum11,735
| 11-23
|- style="background:#fcc;"
| 35
| January 14
| Charlotte
| L 122-130
| Nick Van Exel (29)
| George Lynch (10)
| Vlade Divac (8)
| Great Western Forum16,011
| 11-24
|- style="background:#fcc;"
| 36
| January 18
| @ Seattle
| L 88-103
| Nick Van Exel (22)
| Vlade Divac (15)
| Tony Smith (4)
| Seattle Center Coliseum14,627
| 11-25
|- style="background:#cfc;"
| 37
| January 20
| Phoenix
| W 107-102
| James Worthy (22)
| Vlade Divac (13)
| Lynch & Van Exel (6)
| Great Western Forum14,741
| 12-25
|- style="background:#fcc;"
| 38
| January 21
| @ Portland
| L 93-111
| Elden Campbell (27)
| George Lynch (9)
| Nick Van Exel (10)
| Memorial Coliseum12,888
| 12-26
|- style="background:#cfc;"
| 39
| January 26
| Indiana
| W 103-99
| Vlade Divac (26)
| Vlade Divac (11)
| Vlade Divac (7)
| Great Western Forum11,577
| 13-26
|- style="background:#cfc;"
| 40
| January 28
| Detroit
| W 105-97
| Lynch & Threatt (20)
| George Lynch (18)
| Nick Van Exel (8)
| Great Western Forum13,235
| 14-26

|- style="background:#fcc;"
| 41
| February 1
| @ San Antonio
| L 97-112
| Nick Van Exel (24)
| Elden Campbell (10)
| Campbell & Van Exel (4)
| Alamodome17,397
| 14-27
|- style="background:#fcc;"
| 42
| February 3
| @ Houston
| L 88-99
| Elden Campbell (29)
| Vlade Divac (15)
| Sedale Threatt (4)
| The Summit12,092
| 14-28
|- style="background:#cfc;"
| 43
| February 4
| @ Dallas
| W 95-87
| George Lynch (26)
| Vlade Divac (19)
| Vlade Divac (7)
| Reunion Arena15,482
| 15-28
|- style="background:#cfc;"
| 44
| February 6
| Utah
| W 107-90
| Reggie Jordan (28)
| Vlade Divac (23)
| Vlade Divac (9)
| Great Western Forum11,777
| 16-28
|- style="background:#cfc;"
| 45
| February 8
| Phoenix
| W 107-104
| Sedale Threatt (26)
| Vlade Divac (15)
| Divac & Threatt (8)
| Great Western Forum12,100
| 17-28
|- style="background:#cfc;"
| 46
| February 9
| @ Utah
| W 103-96
| Sedale Threatt (25)
| George Lynch (12)
| Nick Van Exel (6)
| Delta Center19,911
| 18-28
|- style="background:#fcc;"
| 47
| February 10
| Sacramento
| L 84-103
| Nick Van Exel (17)
| George Lynch (16)
| Nick Van Exel (5)
| Great Western Forum10,785
| 18-29
|- align="center"
|colspan="9" bgcolor="#bbcaff"|All-Star Break
|- style="background:#cfc;"
|- bgcolor="#bbffbb"
|- style="background:#fcc;"
| 48
| February 15
| L.A. Clippers
| L 89-100
| James Worthy (15)
| Vlade Divac (16)
| Vlade Divac (12)
| Great Western Forum11,954
| 18-30
|- style="background:#fcc;"
| 49
| February 18
| @ Phoenix
| L 96-113
| Elden Campbell (25)
| Elden Campbell (10)
| 3 players tied (4)
| American West Arena19,023
| 18-31
|- style="background:#cfc;"
| 50
| February 20
| Philadelphia
| W 107-95
| Sedale Threatt (21)
| Vlade Divac (9)
| James Worthy (7)
| Great Western Forum11,662
| 19-31
|- style="background:#fcc;"
| 51
| February 24
| @ Sacramento
| L 90-102
| Sedale Threatt (28)
| Vlade Divac (16)
| 3 players tied (5)
| ARCO Arena17,317
| 19-32
|- style="background:#fcc;"
| 52
| February 25
| San Antonio
| L 110-126
| Vlade Divac (21)
| Vlade Divac (10)
| Sedale Threatt (9)
| Great Western Forum13,783
| 19-33
|- style="background:#cfc;"
| 53
| February 27
| Boston
| W 100-97
| Vlade Divac (28)
| Vlade Divac (13)
| Nick Van Exel (12)
| Great Western Forum13,063
| 20-33

|- style="background:#cfc;"
| 54
| March 2
| @ Chicago
| W 97-89
| Vlade Divac (27)
| Vlade Divac (11)
| Sedale Threatt (10)
| Chicago Stadium18,146
| 21-33
|- style="background:#fcc;"
| 55
| March 4
| @ Boston
| L 99-109
| Nick Van Exel (26)
| Vlade Divac (11)
| Sedale Threatt (8)
| Boston Garden14,890
| 21-34
|- style="background:#fcc;"
| 56
| March 5
| @ Washington
| L 118-124
| Sedale Threatt (32)
| Vlade Divac (14)
| Divac & Van Exel (7)
| USAir Arena18,756
| 21-35
|- style="background:#cfc;"
| 57
| March 7
| @ Milwaukee
| W 106-84
| Tony Smith (25)
| 3 players tied (10)
| Divac & Van Exel (5)
| Bradley Center14,978
| 22-35
|- style="background:#cfc;"
| 58
| March 10
| Dallas
| W 106-101
| Vlade Divac (22)
| Vlade Divac (17)
| Vlade Divac (12)
| Great Western Forum11,149
| 23-35
|- style="background:#cfc;"
| 59
| March 13
| @ Minnesota
| W 90-88
| Vlade Divac (18)
| Vlade Divac (13)
| Sedale Threatt (11)
| Target Center17,255
| 24-35
|- style="background:#fcc;"
| 60
| March 14
| @ Utah
| L 101-102
| Nick Van Exel (22)
| Vlade Divac (13)
| Vlade Divac (7)
| Delta Center19,911
| 24-36
|- style="background:#cfc;"
| 61
| March 16
| Washington
| W 129-94
| Nick Van Exel (21)
| 3 players tied (10)
| Nick Van Exel (11)
| Great Western Forum11,004
| 25-36
|- style="background:#fcc;"
| 62
| March 18
| New Jersey
| L 90-102
| Vlade Divac (18)
| Vlade Divac (11)
| Nick Van Exel (10)
| Great Western Forum12,251
| 25-37
|- style="background:#cfc;"
| 63
| March 20
| Orlando
| W 97-91
| Sedale Threatt (30)
| Elden Campbell (13)
| Vlade Divac (9)
| Great Western Forum17,505
| 26-37
|- style="background:#cfc;"
| 64
| March 21
| Miami
| W 84-81
| Sedale Threatt (23)
| Vlade Divac (15)
| Divac & Van Exel (6)
| Great Western Forum11,497
| 27-37
|- style="background:#cfc;"
| 65
| March 23
| @ Dallas
| W 112-109
| Nick Van Exel (28)
| Elden Campbell (13)
| Divac & Van Exel (6)
| Reunion Arena12,484
| 28-37
|- style="background:#fcc;"
| 66
| March 24
| @ Houston
| L 107-113
| Elden Campbell (25)
| Divac & Lynch (9)
| Vlade Divac (7)
| The Summit14,688
| 28-38
|- style="background:#cfc;"
| 67
| March 27
| Milwaukee
| W 110-101
| George Lynch (30)
| Vlade Divac (19)
| Nick Van Exel (8)
| Great Western Forum17,505
| 29-38
|- style="background:#cfc;"
| 68
| March 29
| Minnesota
| W 91-89
| Elden Campbell (27)
| Vlade Divac (11)
| Nick Van Exel (8)
| Great Western Forum13,588
| 30-38
|- style="background:#fcc;"
| 69
| March 31
| @ Seattle
| L 92-95
| Elden Campbell (19)
| Campbell & Lynch (7)
| Tony Smith (6)
| Seattle Center Coliseum14,813
| 30-39

|- style="background:#cfc;"
| 70
| April 1
| Houston
| W 101-88
| Nick Van Exel (31)
| Vlade Divac (13)
| 3 players tied (4)
| Great Western Forum15,316
| 31-39
|- style="background:#cfc;"
| 71
| April 3
| Atlanta
| W 101-89
| Elden Campbell (17)
| Elden Campbell (10)
| Nick Van Exel (10)
| Great Western Forum14,249
| 32-39
|- style="background:#cfc;"
| 72
| April 6
| Sacramento
| W 128-123 (OT)
| James Worthy (31)
| Vlade Divac (14)
| 3 players tied (8)
| Great Western Forum12,066
| 33-39
|- style="background:#fcc;"
| 73
| April 8
| Denver
| L 99-112
| Vlade Divac (33)
| Vlade Divac (9)
| Van Exel & Worthy (10)
| Great Western Forum17,505
| 33-40
|- style="background:#fcc;"
| 74
| April 9
| @ Portland
| L 104-112
| Tony Smith (18)
| Vlade Divac (12)
| Sedale Threatt (7)
| Memorial Coliseum12,888
| 33-41
|- style="background:#fcc;"
| 75
| April 12
| Golden State
| L 117-128
| Tony Smith (22)
| Vlade Divac (11)
| Nick Van Exel (11)
| Great Western Forum13,302
| 33-42
|- style="background:#fcc;"
| 76
| April 13
| @ Phoenix
| L 88-117
| Tony Smith (22)
| 3 players tied (7)
| Nick Van Exel (8)
| American West Arena19,023
| 33-43
|- style="background:#fcc;"
| 77
| April 15
| Portland
| L 100-105
| Elden Campbell (21)
| Vlade Divac (10)
| Nick Van Exel (10)
| Great Western Forum14,494
| 33-44
|- style="background:#fcc;"
| 78
| April 16
| @ L.A. Clippers
| L 103-108
| Nick Van Exel (28)
| George Lynch (12)
| Nick Van Exel (5)
| Los Angeles Memorial Sports Arena16,005
| 33-45
|- style="background:#fcc;"
| 79
| April 19
| @ Denver
| L 98-105
| Vlade Divac (22)
| Campbell & Divac (8)
| Tony Smith (6)
| McNichols Sports Arena17,171
| 33-46
|- style="background:#fcc;"
| 80
| April 20
| Seattle
| L 90-112
| Sedale Threatt (28)
| Doug Christie (8)
| Christie & Threatt (7)
| Great Western Forum15,283
| 33-47
|- style="background:#fcc;"
| 81
| April 23
| @ Golden State
| L 91-126
| Tony Smith (19)
| 3 players tied (8)
| Christie & Van Exel (5)
| Oakland-Alameda County Coliseum Arena15,025
| 33-48
|- style="background:#fcc;"
| 82
| April 24
| Utah
| L 97-103
| Nick Van Exel (21)
| Kurt Rambis (9)
| Nick Van Exel (9)
| Great Western Forum15,338
| 33-49

Player statistics

NOTE: Please write the players statistics in alphabetical order by last name.

Awards and records

Transactions

References

Los Angeles Lakers seasons
Los Angle
Los Angle
Los Angle